Darryl Hinds is a Canadian actor and sketch comedian, best known as a cast member of Royal Canadian Air Farce's annual New Year's Eve specials in the 2010s.

Early life 
Hinds was born in Canada to Jamaican immigrants, with an Afro-Jamaican father and an Indo-Caribbean mother.

Career 
He had stage acting roles in his early career, and was a member of the sketch comedy troupe Electric Boogaloo, before joining the Toronto company of The Second City in 2007 as a cast member in the revue Facebook of Revelations. He also starred in the 2008 revue Barack to the Future, in which he appeared in several sketches as Barack Obama, and in the 2009 shows 0% Down, 100% Screwed and Shut Up and Show Us Your Tweets.

He joined the Royal Canadian Air Farce for a 2014 special, remaining with the troupe until their final special in 2019.

In 2020, he participated in Mass Hysterical: A Comedic Cantata, a webcast collaboration between Second City alumni and the Toronto Symphony Orchestra which presented a comedic history of the use of classical and liturgical music in the church.

As an actor, he has had recurring or guest roles in the television series Combat Hospital, Little Mosque on the Prairie, Rookie Blue, Odd Squad and Murdoch Mysteries, and a starring role in the 2021 family sitcom Overlord and the Underwoods. He received a Canadian Screen Award nomination for Best Actor in a Comedy Series at the 10th Canadian Screen Awards in 2022, for Overlord and the Underwoods.

Filmography

Film

Television

References

External links
 
 

21st-century Canadian male actors
Canadian male stage actors
Canadian male television actors
Canadian male comedians
Canadian sketch comedians
Comedians from Toronto
Black Canadian male actors
Black Canadian comedians
Canadian male actors of Indian descent
Canadian people of Jamaican descent
Male actors from Toronto
Living people
Year of birth missing (living people)